Ballifurth Farm Halt railway station was one of four halts, and Ballifurth Farm Halt, opened on the Speyside route between Elgin and Aviemore, Scotland, on 15 June 1959, on the introduction of railbuses. Drivers were warned when approaching the halts by white boards stating 'Request Stop 100 Yards Ahead'.

History

Opened by the Scottish Region of British Railways in 1959, it was then closed by the British Railways Board when services on the line were withdrawn in 1965.

The site today
The track bed is now Speyside Way.

References

External links
  Railbuses
 Site of station on navigable O.S. map

Disused railway stations in Highland (council area)
Railway stations opened by British Rail
Railway stations in Great Britain opened in 1959
Railway stations in Great Britain closed in 1965
Beeching closures in Scotland